Alexiares and Anicetus are minor deities in Greek mythology. They are the immortal twin sons of Heracles, the greatest of the Greek heroes and the strongest mortal to live; and Hebe, the goddess of youth and the server of ambrosia and nectar to the other Olympian gods. Along with their father Heracles, they possibly were the guardians of Mount Olympus, and the pair may have been regarded as the gatekeepers of Olympus, a role which was often assigned to their immortal father. Additionally, they were likely responsible for the protection and fortification of towns and citadels. They were born after the hero's mortal death and ascent to Olympus, where he gained immortality and married the goddess Hebe. Callimachus makes a reference to Hebe receiving assistance from her sister, Eiliethyia the goddess of midwifery, while in labour. Their names mean "he who wards off war" and "the unconquerable one" respectively.
It is possible they were worshipped at Thebes and Rhodes. Little is known about them besides a mention of their birth in the Bibliotheca: "Heracles achieved immortality, and when Hera’s enmity changed to friendship, he married her daughter Hebe, who bore him sons Alexiares and Anicetus."

See also
 Móði and Magni

References

Greek gods
Heracleidae
Religion in ancient Rhodes
Religion in ancient Boeotia
Children of Heracles
Sibling duos
Olympian deities